Mizuno Senko (3 December 1888 – 31 May 1919) (水野仙子 in Japanese, or みずの せんこ in kana) was a Japanese writer, born Tei Hattori. In her short career, she was published as a novelist, story writer, essayist, and journalist.

Early life 
Senko was born in Sukugawa, Fukushima, one of the daughters of Naotaro Hattori. She graduated from high school in Sukugawa, and trained at Sukagawa Sewing College. She later studied with writer Tayama Katai in Tokyo.

Career 
Senko was a writer from her youth; she began publishing short essays in Joshi Bundan in 1905. She worked at Seitō (Bluestocking), a feminist literary magazine, and was a reporter for the Yomiuri Shimbun newspaper. Much of Senko's writing was on topics related to women's lives, relationships, bodies, and illness. For example, her short story "For More Than Forty Days" ("Shijūyonichi", 1910), centers on a pregnant rural woman. "Dignity of a Dog" ("Inu no igen"), another short story, features two women discussing marriage and their husbands' faults.

Personal life 
Senko married journalist Dosan Kawanami in 1911. She fell ill with liver disease and pleurisy in 1918, and died at Kusatsu Onsen, a hot springs resort in Gunma Prefecture, in 1919, at the age of 30. Her widower published a collection of her works in 1920.

References 

1888 births
1919 deaths
Japanese women writers
People from Fukushima Prefecture
Japanese novelists
Japanese journalists
Deaths from liver disease